Kastna may refer to several places in Estonia:

Kastna, Pärnu County, village in Tõstamaa Parish, Pärnu County
Kastna, Rapla County, village in Kehtna Parish, Rapla County